Stepnoy is a rural locality (a village) in Bolsheokinsky Selsoviet, Mechetlinsky District, Bashkortostan, Russia. The population was 190 as of 2010. There are 2 streets.

Geography 
Stepnoy is located 20 km northwest of Bolsheustyikinskoye (the district's administrative centre) by road. Bolshaya Oka is the nearest rural locality.

References 

Rural localities in Mechetlinsky District